Johann Sebastian Bach composed the church cantata  (Praise the Lord, my soul), 69a, also BWV69.1, in Leipzig for the twelfth Sunday after Trinity and first performed it on 15 August 1723. It is part of his first cantata cycle.

History and words 
Bach wrote the cantata in his first year in Leipzig, which he had started after Trinity of 1723, for the Twelfth Sunday after Trinity. The prescribed readings for the Sunday were from the Second Epistle to the Corinthians, the ministry of the Spirit, and from the Gospel of Mark, the healing of a deaf mute man. The unknown poet referred to the gospel, but saw in the healing more generally God constantly doing good for man. The poetry refers to "telling" several times, related to the healed man's ability to speak: "Ah, that I had a thousand tongues!" (movement 2), "My soul, arise! tell" (movement 3) and "My mouth is weak, my tongue mute to speak Your praise and honor" (movement 4). The closing chorale picks up the theme in the sixth verse of Samuel Rodigast's hymn "" (What God does, is done well) (1675).

Bach first performed the cantata on 15 August 1723. He performed it again around 1727, revised the instrumentation of an aria, and used it in his last years for a cantata for a  ceremony, the inauguration of the town council at church, .

Scoring and structure 
To express the praise of the words, the cantata is festively scored for soprano, alto, tenor and bass soloists, a four-part choir, and a Baroque instrumental ensemble of three trumpets, timpani, three oboes, oboe da caccia, oboe d'amore, recorder, bassoon, two violins, viola, and basso continuo.

The cantata is in six movements:
 Chorus: 
 Recitative (soprano): 
 Aria (tenor): 
 Recitative (alto): 
 Aria (bass): 
 Chorale:

Music 
Bach reflected the duality within the words of the psalm in the opening chorus by creating a double fugue. Both themes of the movement in D Major are handled separately first and then combined. In the first aria, a pastoral movement, the tenor is accompanied by oboe da caccia, recorder and bassoon. In a later version around 1727 Bach changed the instrumentation to alto, oboe and violin, possibly because he did not have players at hand for the first woodwind setting.

Recordings 
 J. S. Bach: Das Kantatenwerk – Sacred Cantatas Vol. 4, Nikolaus Harnoncourt, Tölzer Knabenchor, Concentus Musicus Wien, soloist of the Tölzer Knabenchor, Paul Esswood, Kurt Equiluz, Ruud van der Meer, Teldec 1977
 J. S. Bach: Complete Cantatas Vol. 6, Ton Koopman, Amsterdam Baroque Orchestra & Choir, Ruth Ziesak, Elisabeth von Magnus, Paul Agnew, Klaus Mertens, Antoine Marchand 1997
 J. S. Bach: Cantatas Vol. 13, Masaaki Suzuki, Bach Collegium Japan, Yoshie Hida, Kirsten Sollek-Avella, Makoto Sakurada, Peter Kooy, BIS 1999
 Edition Bachakademie Vol. 140 – Sacred Vocal Works, Helmuth Rilling, Gächinger Kantorei, Bach-Collegium Stuttgart, Sibylla Rubens, Anke Vondung, Marcus Ullmann, Hänssler 1999
 Bach Cantatas Vol. 6, John Eliot Gardiner, Monteverdi Choir, English Baroque Soloists, Katharine Fuge, Robin Tyson, Christoph Genz, Peter Harvey, Soli Deo Gloria [2000]

References

Sources 
 
 Cantata BWV 69a Lobe den Herrn, meine Seele: history, scoring, sources for text and music, translations to various languages, discography, discussion, Bach Cantatas Website
 Chapter 15 BWV 69a Lobe den Herrn, meine Seele / Bless the Lord, my soul. Julian Mincham, 2010
 Luke Dahn: BWV 69a.6 bach-chorales.com

Church cantatas by Johann Sebastian Bach
Psalm-related compositions by Johann Sebastian Bach
1723 compositions